Benjamin Danso (born 9 January 1984) is a German international rugby union player, playing for the Heidelberger RK in the Rugby-Bundesliga and the German national rugby union team.

Danso played in the 2011 and 2012 German championship final for Heidelberger RK, which the club both won.

He plays rugby since 2004. He originally played for the DRC Hannover in the Bundesliga but left the club after its relegation in 2009 to join Heidelberger RK. He made his debut for Germany in 2006 in a game against Switzerland. His final match was in 2016, in a test between Germany and Spain in Cologne.

Honours

Club
 German rugby union championship
 Champions: 2010, 2011, 2012, 2013
 German rugby union cup
 Winners: 2006, 2011

National team
 European Nations Cup - Division 2
 Champions: 2008

Stats
Benjamin Danso's personal statistics in club and international rugby:

Club

 As of 4 December 2013

National team

European Nations Cup

Friendlies & other competitions

 As of 4 December 2013

References

External links
 Benjamin Danso at scrum.com
   Benjamin Danso at totalrugby.de
  Benjamin Danso at the DRV website

1984 births
Living people
German rugby union players
Germany international rugby union players
DRC Hannover players
Heidelberger RK players
Rugby union locks